Petar Zanković was a Montenegrin man who helped shelter three Jewish families throughout World War II. In 2007, he was recognized as Righteous Among the Nations by Israel.

World War II 
During World War II, the Richter family fled from Zagreb to Belgrade during the Invasion of Yugoslavia. When the Germans and their allies fully took control of the country, Milan Rithter took his son, Marjan, to Petar Zanković's home in Italian-controlled Sutomore, Montenegro. Milan had served in World War I with Petar's father, and the families had remained in contact over the years. A bit later the rest of the family made the journey to the Zanković home. The Richters did not want to put the other family at risk, so they moved into a hotel in the town of Bar, Montenegro along with other Jewish refugees from Belgrade.

The Ritchers became involved with rebels and during an offensive launched by partisans, Milan Richter was captured and sent to a concentration camp in Klos, Albania. Petar Zanković enlisted the help of a bishop named Dobričić to get Milan released and after securing it, the Ritchers moved back in with the Zankovićs. The family stayed there until 1943. In September of that year, Germany took control of territories previously occupied by Italy. In response Petar moved the family to a monastery in Bar temporally, before taking them to the village of Livari. In February of 1944, the Nazis found their address and they were sent to the Bergen-Belsen concentration camp. Despite this, the family of five survived until the end of the war.

Post World War II 
Adele Richter later went to visit the Zankovićs to thank them for helping them throughout the war. While there she learned that the Zankovićs had sheltered two other families besides them, which led to their arrests and various punishments. In December 2006, he was recognized as Righteous Among Nations by Yad Vashem.

References 

2002 deaths
1924 births
Yugoslav Righteous Among the Nations